Lara Roxx  is a Canadian woman who, in March 2004, became the first of three known individuals in four years to contract HIV while making a U.S. pornographic video.

Career
Roxx became famous in 2004 at age 21, after being exposed to HIV while doing a pornographic scene with Darren James. She allegedly contracted the virus just two months after doing her first scene, a double anal. Roxx said previously that she relied on the industry's HIV standards to ensure her safety.

James and Roxx have been banned from any further porn production in the US. At the end of April 2004, it was confirmed that Jessica Dee and Miss Arroyo, after having worked with James, also tested positive for HIV.

Roxx, upon learning about James' being HIV-positive, said, "It totally made me realize how I trusted this system that wasn't to be trusted at all, because it obviously doesn't work," and "I thought porn people were the cleanest people in the world."

She is the subject of the Canadian documentary film Inside Lara Roxx, directed by Canadian filmmaker and photographer Mia Donovan, which explores Roxx's 2004 HIV infection and her life since the media coverage of this incident subsided.

See also
 Adult Industry Medical Health Care Foundation
 STDs in the porn industry

References

Further reading

External links

 
 
 
 

Year of birth missing (living people)
Living people
Actresses from Quebec
Canadian pornographic film actresses
Activists from Quebec
People with HIV/AIDS